Behlolpur, is a town of Depalpur Tehsil in the Okara District of Punjab Province, Pakistan. The town is located at 30°42'0N 73°49'0E with an altitude of 174 metres (574 feet) and is part of the NA-145 constituency of the National Assembly.

References

Union councils of Okara District